Amerila fumida is a moth of the subfamily Arctiinae. It was described by Charles Swinhoe in 1901. It is found in Indonesia (Halmaheira Islands and Timor).

References

 , 1910: Catalogue of the Arctianae in the Tring museum, with notes and descriptions of new species. Novitates Zoologicae 17 (1): 1-85, (2): 113–188, pl. XI-XIV, 18: pl. III-VI, London and Aylesbury.
 , 1901: New genera and species of Eastern and Australian moths. Annals and Magazine of Natural History (7) 7: 463–473.

Moths described in 1901
Amerilini
Moths of Indonesia